Triaenophorus may refer to:

 Triaenophorus (flatworm), a genus of flatworms in the family Triaenophoridae
 Triaenophorus, a genus of fishes in the family Oxudercidae; synonym of Tridentiger